Sacha, Sasha, Sascha, or variant may refer to:

People
 Sasha (name), includes list of people with the name and the variants Sascha or Sacha

Musicians
 Sasha (DJ) (born 1969), born Alexander Coe
 Sasha (German singer) (born 1972), born Sascha Schmitz
 Sasha (Jamaican musician) (born 1974), gospel singer and former deejay, born Christine Chin

Animals
 Sasha (dog) (2004–2008), a Labrador dog that served in the British Army
 Galianora sacha (G. sacha), Ecuadorian jumping spider
 "Sasha", name given to a frozen specimen of the extinct woolly rhinoceros

Arts, entertainment, and media
Sasha, a 2003 album by Sasha Gradiva
 Pour Sacha,  For Sacha, 1991 film
 "Sascha … ein aufrechter Deutscher", a 1992 song by Die Toten Hosen from the album Kauf MICH!
 Sascha-Film, defunct Austrian film company

Other uses
 Sasha-class minesweeper, NATO designated name, Soviet Navy minesweeper class

See also 
 Shasha (disambiguation)